TAL Technologies, Inc. is a privately owned software development company which develops and sells applications that automate data collection. Their main product lines include WinWedge, TCP-Com, TAL Barcode ActiveX Control and B-Coder Professional Barcode software.

Corporate history

 1985: TAL Technologies, Inc. was founded by President, Thomas Lutz 
 1989: Released Software Wedge for DOS, a RS-232 data collection software 
 1990: Released WinWedge, a Windows-based RS-232 data collection software 
 1990: Released B-Coder, a Barcode image generating software 
 2001: Introduced CE-Wedge, an RS-232 data collection software for Pocket PCs 
 2002: Introduced TCP-Com, an RS-232 to TCP/IP converter software

Key Products

TAL Technologies, Inc. major product lines include:

• WinWedge - RS-232 data collection products for quality control and laboratory instruments including balances, scales, pH meters, spectrophotometers, force gauges, digital electronic measuring instruments, etc.

• TCP/Com - Multifunction serial to ethernet (and ethernet to serial) interface software. Easily access a serial device via a TCP/IP or UDP network or redirect Ethernet/IP data to real or “Virtual” RS-232 serial ports.

• B-Coder - Software for generating customized barcode images of various symbologies such as Code 39, UPC, PDF417, Data Matrix, etc.

• Barcode ActiveX Control - ActiveX Control used for generating barcode images

References

Software companies based in Pennsylvania
Companies based in Philadelphia
Privately held companies based in Pennsylvania
American companies established in 1985
1985 establishments in Pennsylvania
Software companies of the United States
Software companies established in 1985